Margaretta Craig OBE (1902–1963) was an American nurse and a missionary of the Presbyterian Church who served as Principal of the School of Nursing Administration, New Delhi (1943–1946) and later as the Principal of College of Nursing, New Delhi (now Rajkumari Amrit Kaur College of Nursing), (1946–1958).

Education

Professional career 
Craig left for India in 1930 and remained in India for the rest of her professional career. She joined Wanless Hospital, Miraj in western India in 1930 where she worked until she was called by the Government of India in 1943 to head the newly established School of Nursing Administration in New Delhi.  She served as Principal of the School of Nursing Administration, New Delhi (1943-1946) and later as the Principal of College of Nursing (now Rajkumari Amrit Kaur College of Nursing), New Delhi (1946–1958).

After her retirement in 1958 from the College of Nursing, New Delhi (now Rajkumari Amrit Kaur College of Nursing), Margaretta Craig joined Christian Medical College, Ludhiana as Nursing Superintendent where she worked until her death in 1963. Ms. Craig was instrumental in establishing the Nursing School at Christian Medical College, Ludhiana.

Awards and honours 
 OBE (civil division) in January 1948 
 Florence Nightingale Medal by  International Committee of the Red Cross (ICRC) in 1955

Legacy 
 Margaretta Craig hostel in the main campus of Christian Medical College, Ludhiana is named after her. 
 Margaretta Craig Scholarship is available for students of Rajkumari Amrit Kaur College of Nursing, New Delhi
 Margaretta Craig memorial prize instituted by the The Trained Nurses' Association of India

References 

1902 births
1963 deaths
Johns Hopkins School of Nursing alumni
American nurses